Thomas Koll (born October 11, 1956) is a technology business executive and chairman and CEO of Laplink Software, a provider of PC migration software based in Bellevue, Washington. Before joining Laplink in 2003, Koll served as chairman and CEO of Infowave Software and vice president of Microsoft's Network Solutions Group. He also was an author and publisher in his home country of Germany.

Education

Koll attended the Free University of Berlin where he received B.A. and M.A. degrees in political science. He served as lecturer and assistant professor of International Politics at the university's Otto-Suhr Institute for five years.

Academia and Publishing
At the Otto-Suhr-Institute (Dep. of Political Science) Koll was also the administrator for the Center for International Services (Spezialisierungsschwerpunkt Internationale Dienste), which coordinated the studies and programs for international careers in diplomacy and service in international organizations. As part of that he was the lead on the introduction of the ERASMUS program and created exchange programs with the London School of Economics and the University of Sussex.

During his studies Koll joined the Wissenschaftlicher Autoren-Verlag as co-owner and Associate Publisher (1979–84) where he published 21 books on political and history subjects. Among them was Bernd Schimmer's “Recht ohne Gerechtigkeit” (“Law Without Justice”), which described the work of the special courts during the Nazi-Regime violating human rights and furthering the Nazis' racist agenda. After departing WAV Koll founded his own company (1984–88) specializing on city literature and architectural history. The company published four books.

During his time at the university Koll also published four books as co-author or editor. Highlight was the 1988 collection of original articles on the World Bank: Die Weltbank: Structur, Aufgaben und Bedeutung.

Software Industry Career

Koll joined Microsoft Germany in 1988 and went on to have a 13-year tenure at the Redmond, Washington-based software giant. While at Microsoft Germany, Koll held a variety of sales and marketing positions, including acting country manager.  In June 1997, Koll transferred to Microsoft headquarters in Redmond, Washington, where he was general manager of worldwide business strategy and chief of staff for Microsoft CVP and later President and CEO Steve Ballmer. In 1998, he was promoted to vice president – Network Solutions Group where he was responsible for the company's worldwide business with telecommunications firms, network equipment providers and internet service providers. Koll was instrumental in developing Microsoft's vision for the telecommunications industry and developing strategic partnerships. He predicted in 2000 that “delivery of applications over the internet may be the majority of Microsoft’s software revenue.”

Koll left Microsoft in 2001 to become CEO of Burnaby, B.C.-based Infowave Software, a developer of software for connecting business applications to wireless devices. He stepped down as CEO in 2002 but remained chairman.

In 2003 Koll purchased a controlling interest in Laplink Software and became chairman and CEO.  He moved the firm from Bothell, Washington, to Kirkland, Washington. Under his leadership the company released several new products and expanded its focus into new areas including peer-to-peer file sharing. The company achieved sustained success and growth without the need for venture capital funding.
Over the course of Koll's time at Laplink, he and the firm have maintained a close partnership with Microsoft. The partnership with Microsoft was extended in March 2020 to offer free and discounted versions of Laplink PCmover software to remote workers who have been forced to work from home during the COVID-19 pandemic.

References

1956 births
Living people
Information technology management
Free University of Berlin alumni
German businesspeople
Microsoft employees